"Science Fiction/Double Feature" is the opening song to the original 1973 musical stage production, The Rocky Horror Show as well as its 1975 film counterpart The Rocky Horror Picture Show, book, music and lyrics by Richard O'Brien, musical arrangements by Richard Hartley. The song is reprised at the end of the show, with lyrics that reflect on the final events of the story.

The song is a tribute to and sendup of various B movies and serials parodied in the show itself.

Overview 
The film opens with a title sequence of a disembodied mouth against a black background singing in homage to classic science fiction films. (The image holds inspired impact of both the immobile lips fixed in a Mona Lisa smile in Man Ray's surreal painting A l'heure de l'observatoire, les Amoureux, and Samuel Beckett's active isolated mouth in his theatre work Not I.)  It was sung by Richard O'Brien and lip synced, as the now-iconic pair of red lips, by co-star Patricia Quinn. In its original incarnation, The Rocky Horror Show, the song was performed by the character Magenta doubling as the credited role of "Usherette". This character took on the unofficial names of "Miss Strawberry Time", "Trixie" and the "Belasco Popcorn Girl" from props carried on stage during the number. For the filming of the opening sequence, Quinn's head had to be strapped to a board to keep it stationary for filming.

The song is made up of fragments from 1950s subgenre horror and science fiction films and likened to that of avant-garde artist Tristan Tzara by author Vera Dika in her book, Recycled Culture in Contemporary Art and Film. Tzara would construct poems by taking snippets of words from newspapers and placing them into a bag to randomly draw from and arrange. Instead, the words in "Science Fiction/Double Feature" are purposely made to rhyme with a set structure and set with phrases that create cohesion.

The original concept of the song for the feature film as indicated in the original script was to have film clips of each movie shown with a scratched aged effect overlay during the song and opening credits. The idea was dropped when it became apparent that the cost of acquiring the rights to these clips in 1974 was far too prohibitive.

The song is in the key of A major and the reprise of the song is in the key of B♭ major.

Musical number 
In the original stage version, the prologue of the show features the usherette singing "Science Fiction/Double Feature" as she enters after the theater lighting has been dimmed. A spotlight follows her as she carries her refreshment tray down the aisle and onto the stage.

In the film version, production designer Brian Thomson decided to use Patricia Quinn's lipsticked mouth against a black background, lip syncing to Richard O'Brien's vocal, with the picture inverted. Inspired by the Man Ray painting entitled A l'heure de l'observatoire, les Amoureux (1966), the opening number (prologue) is sung by these disembodied lips that freeze in place for the credits. The prologue was originally going to feature shots from the films referenced in the song under the opening credits.

List of items referenced in song
Below is a list of the actors, films and novels referenced in the song, listed in order of their appearance in the lyrics.
 Michael Rennie
 The Day the Earth Stood Still (1951)
 Flash Gordon
 Claude Rains
 The Invisible Man
 Fay Wray
 King Kong (1933)
 It Came From Outer Space (1953)
 Doctor X (1932)
 Anne Francis
 Forbidden Planet (1956)
 Leo G. Carroll
 Tarantula! (1955)
 Janette Scott
 The Day of the Triffids (1962)
 Dana Andrews
 Night of the Demon (1957)
 When Worlds Collide (1951)
 George Pal
 RKO Pictures
In addition, the song's chorus makes a meta-reference to Rocky Horror characters "Brad and Janet" fighting androids (which does not happen in the story).

References

External links
 The Annotated "Science Fiction/Double Feature"
 

1973 songs
Songs from Rocky Horror
Songs with lyrics by Richard O'Brien
Songs with music by Richard Hartley (composer)